Justin Busia (born November 27, 1989), also known as D.King or DK, is an American rapper, songwriter, and recording artist in the hip hop genre.  The name "D.King" or "DK" is short for "Don and the King".

Early life

Raised in Baltimore, Maryland, D.King began rapping at an early age, and in 2000 was managed by the mother of Beanie Sigel at Black Friday Management. That same year at the Hip Hop Summit, which he and a friend snuck into, D. King impressed the A & R of Roc-A-Fella Records with a demo tape.

Music career

His career began as a collaborative artist/writer for Trina and Teairra Marie in 2011 while attending Howard University. He has received critical acclaim from Sway in the morning, 2dopeboyz , Rap Radar , Complex, Earmilk, and Karen Civil.

In 2014, he started his own label of songwriters and producers called the 730 Commission and began working on his debut album featuring Snoop Dogg, Trina, Pusha T, and Benny the Butcher. The completed music video for D.King’s first single “Knockaz, featuring Benny the Butcher is slated for release in 2022. This will be followed up by Beautiful Thing featuring Snoop Dogg which will be the blockbuster single with international push. He also has a completed Revolt TV feature awaiting his official release.

References 

1989 births
African-American male rappers
American male rappers
Living people
Rappers from Baltimore
21st-century American rappers
21st-century American male musicians
21st-century African-American musicians
20th-century African-American people